Digital Eel is a self-funded independent video game development team located in the Seattle, Washington area. Digital Eel is best known for its Infinite Space series of space roguelikes.

History 
The group was formed in 2001 by Rich Carlson (Ion Storm, Looking Glass Studios), Iikka Keränen (Looking Glass Studios, Valve) and Bill "Phosphorus" Sears (KnowWonder, GameHouse).

In April 2013, Digital Eel announced plans for the third installment of the Infinite Space series, Infinite Space III: Sea of Stars, and turned to Kickstarter.com to crowdfund the project. Funding was successful.

Developers
Rich Carlson – design, sound, music and art
Iikka Keränen – design, code and art
Bill "Phosphorus" Sears (deceased) – artist, music and design 
Henry Kropf – code, macOS expert
Chris Collins - code, macOS expert, Android expert

Games
Weird Worlds: Return to Infinite Space (Android, iPad, iPhone, 2021)
Strange Adventures in Infinite Space reissue (Linux, macOS, Windows, 2020)
Goblin Slayer Third Edition (boardgame, 2019)
Protagon (VR game, HTC Vive/Windows, 2017)
Infinite Space Battle Poker (card game, 2016)
Pairs: Infinite Space (card game, 2016)
Infinite Space III: Sea of Stars (Windows, Mac, 2015)
Eat Electric Death! (boardgame, 2013)
Infinite Space Explorers: X-1 Expansion (card game, 2012)
Infinite Space Explorers (card game, 2012)
Data Jammers: FastForward (Windows, Mac, 2011 & 2015)
Space Ludo (boardgame, 2009)
BrainPipe: A Plunge to Unhumanity (Windows, Mac & iPhone, 2008 & 2009)
Goblin Slayer (boardgame, 2008)
Soup du Jour (Windows & iPad, 2007 & 2011)
Eat Electric Death! (boardgame, 2007 but publisher defaulted)
Weird Worlds: Return to Infinite Space (Windows, Mac, 2005, 2006, 2011 & 2014)
Diceland Space: Terrans vs. Urluquai (setting, ship types & art, tabletop game, 2005)
Diceland Space: Garthans vs. Muktians (setting, ship types & art, tabletop game, 2005)
Independent Games (Independent Games Festival 30-game compilation CD-ROM that featured Big Box of Blox, Dr. Blob's Organism, Plasmaworm and Strange Adventures in Infinite Space Windows, 2005)
Mac OS X Boiler Plate Special (Mac, 2004)
Digital Eel's Big Box of Blox (Windows, Mac, handhelds, smartphones, 2003–2008)
Dr. Blob's Organism (Windows & Mac, 2003)
Strange Adventures in Infinite Space (Windows, Mac & handhelds, 2002-2020)
Plasmaworm (Windows, July 17, 2001)

Reception 
Digital Eel is best known for its Infinite Space series of space roguelikes, Strange Adventures in Infinite Space (2002), Weird Worlds: Return to Infinite Space (2005) and Infinite Space III: Sea of Stars (2015). Strange Adventures and Weird Worlds pioneered the space roguelike subgenre, inspiring later efforts like FTL: Faster Than Light.

Awards
Excellence in Audio: Brainpipe (IGF, 2009)
Innovation in Audio: Weird Worlds: Return to Infinite Space (IGF, 2006)
Seumas McNally Grand Prize finalist: Weird Worlds: Return to Infinite Space (IGF, 2006)
Quest/Adventure Game of the Year: Weird Worlds: Return to Infinite Space (Game Tunnel, 2005)
Innovation in Visual Art: Dr. Blob's Organism (IGF, 2004)
Innovation in Audio: Dr. Blob's Organism (IGF, 2004)

References

External links

Companies based in Seattle
Indie video game developers
Video game companies of the United States
Video game development companies
Video game companies established in 2001